Steven Franks is a British born American linguist and researcher in the fields of syntax and slavics. Franks received his Ph.D. at Cornell University in 1985. He has written numerous books and articles that have significantly contributed to Slavic linguistics. He is currently a professor of Linguistics, Slavic Languages and Literatures, and Cognitive Science, as well as an adjunct professor of Speech and Hearing Sciences at the Indiana University Bloomington and lives in Bloomington, Indiana with his family.

Selected publications
 1995: Parameters of Slavic Morphosyntax. New York/Oxford: Oxford University Press.
 2000: Clitics in Slavic. With Tracy H. King. New York/Oxford: Oxford University Press
 2017: Syntax and Spell-Out in Slavic. Bloomington, IN: Slavica Publishers.

External links
Official Website

Linguists from the United States
Living people
Year of birth missing (living people)